Information communication and telecommunication economics refers to a broad range approach to the micro and macro economics of data consumption and management, voice or data. This application of micro cum macro economic principles to the subject matter here refers to three clear strategies vis-a-vis information, communication and telecommunication. 
Information refers to data that is accurately organized and timely presented, so as to affect the end user's behavior. Information Economics on the other hand can be defined as the application micro and macro economic principles and policies to information consumption and management which ultimately drives economic, social, cultural and political growth and development. Communication refers to connecting people so as to organize them with a view of driving a common goal. Economics of Communication is about applying micro and macro economic principles to cost effectively connect, organize and achieve clearly defined goals. Telecommunication, is the exchange of information, voice or data, per time per space by electronic means. Then economics of Telecommunication is also the economics of Information Communication & Telecommunication refers to the branch of economics that APPLIES the principles of economics vis-a-vis demand, supply, market structures, consumer and producer behavior to the study and propound applicable theories to ICT markets and industry.

Information, communication and telecommunications economics: Policy options

Water resources management
ICT among other policy tools influence the efficient management of cross- country water resource. More so, Internet Users, Broadband Subscribers, and Mobile cell phones Subscribers strongly affect water resource management performance indicators (WRMPI). Contrary to wide spread expectations, education does not influence WRMPI.

GSM Companies, Job creation, GSM Industry expansion in Nigeria's Informal Sector
Trade policies of GSM companies influence the rate at which the ICT subsector expands. Contrary to wide spread expectations, education does not influence the rate of employment in this industry's informal sector.

References

Information technology consulting
Telecommunications